Lorke is an Armenian folk song-dance. It was performed at weddings when the bride was taken away from her father's house, at the Vardavar festival during the collection of flowers, and also during pilgrimages. It also refers to various types of Armenian collective dances.

There are also Shatakh and Talin (such as Shurjpar  - “circle dance”) versions of the song-dance

Etymology and origin 

Initially, the dance was a ritual and was associated with Armenian mythology. Lorke goes back to totemic dances in honor of quails. The name comes from Arm. լոր [lor] - "quail".

Probably originated from Van and Alashkert region.

Lyrics

References 

Dance in Armenia